Dahlak is an Eritrean football club based in Asmara.

Current squad

Organisations based in Asmara
Football clubs in Eritrea